James Haggerty (1833–1912) was an Ontario farmer and political figure. He represented Hastings North in the Legislative Assembly of Ontario from 1894 to 1898 as a Patrons of Industry member.

He was born in Huntingdon Township, Upper Canada, the son of James Haggerty who came to Upper Canada from Ireland, and was educated there and in Toronto. Haggerty was also a school teacher. He married Ann Fleming. He was president of the North Hastings Agricultural Society and was also president of the West Huntingdon Cheese Manufacturing Company. Haggerty served as reeve for Huntingdon in 1877, 1880–1882 and 1891 to 1894.

External links 
The Canadian parliamentary companion, 1897 JA Gemmill

The Heritage Years : A History of Stirling and District (1983)

1833 births
1912 deaths
Ontario Patrons of Industry MPPs